Golden Gate Cemetery may refer to:

 Golden Gate Cemetery (Croydon, Queensland), in Croydon, Queensland, Australia
 Golden Gate Cemetery (Jerusalem), in Jerusalem, Israel
 Golden Gate Cemetery (San Francisco, California), in San Francisco, California, U.S.
 Golden Gate National Cemetery, in San Bruno, California, U.S.

See also 
 Golden Gate (disambiguation)